Handball at the 2010 Summer Youth Olympics took place at the Suntec Hall 602 in Singapore.

Medalists

Participating teams

Preliminary round

Group A

Group B

Medal round

Semifinals

5th place playoffs

1st leg

2nd leg

Singapore win 59–38 on aggregagate

Bronze medal match

Final

References
 Tournament Summary
 Results list at IHF webage

Handball at the 2010 Summer Youth Olympics